Striatura milium, common name the fine-ribbed striate snail, is a species of minute air-breathing land snail, a terrestrial pulmonate gastropod mollusk or micromollusk in the family Gastrodontidae.

Distribution 
The distribution of Striatura milium includes:
 North America
 The Azores

References

External links 
 SEM image of Striatura milium

Gastrodontidae
Gastropods described in 1859